Khalaf Salamah Al Mutairi (born 25 July 1979) is a Kuwaiti footballer who is a forward for the Kuwaiti Premier League club Al Salmiya on loan from Al Qadsia.

References

External links
 

1979 births
Living people
Kuwaiti footballers
Qadsia SC players
Kuwait international footballers
Olympic footballers of Kuwait
Footballers at the 2000 Summer Olympics
Footballers at the 2002 Asian Games
Sportspeople from Kuwait City
Association football forwards
Asian Games competitors for Kuwait
Al Jahra SC players
Kuwait SC players
Al Salmiya SC players
Kuwait Premier League players